Zeya may refer to:

People 
Aung Zeya, full name of Alaungpaya, king of Burma in 1752–1760
Zeya (Burmese actor) (1916–1996), Burmese actor and director
Zeya Thaw (born 1981), alternative spelling of the name of Zayar Thaw, Burmese politician and hip-hop artist

Places 
Zeya, Wenzhou, a town in Ouhai District, Wenzhou, Zhejiang, China
Zeya (river), a river in Amur Oblast, Russia
Zeya Dam, a dam on the Zeya River in Amur Oblast, Russia
Zeya Urban Okrug, an administrative division and a municipal formation in Amur Oblast, Russia which the town of Zeya is incorporated as
Zeya, Russia, a town in Amur Oblast, Russia
Zeya (satellite), a Russian satellite launched using the Start-1 launch vehicle